Say a Word for the Poor Hussar, translit. . Literary “Put a good word for a poor hussar”) is a 1981 Soviet film directed by Eldar Ryazanov, shot in the style of a historical tragicomedy.

Plot
A regiment of hussars arrives at the provincial town of Gubernsk for summer maneuvers. The hussars live a frivolous outside the barracks and away from the metropolitan authorities, enjoying evening shows in the theater, billiards, card games and flirting with the local women. But soon the regiment gets into trouble when Count Merzlyaev arrives from St. Petersburg on the personal orders of the Russian Emperor with a special mission.

Some officers of the hussars regiment are suspected of "free-thinking" and of conspiring against the government. Merzlyaev offers these officers a test: they must shoot a rebel, thus demonstrating their loyalty to the emperor. However, Merzlyaev's plan to test the officers' loyalty by an "execution by shooting" is a ruse: the cartridges are blank, and the role of "the condemned conspirator" will be played by a stranger. If the officers refuse to shoot they will face a military court and penal servitude.

For the role of the "conspirator" Merzlyaev hires Bubentsov, an actor who is in jail for stupid carelessness. Merzlyaev's ruse goes perfectly, but all of a sudden Cornet Alexei Pletnev, one of the officers who should carry out an execution, lets the "rebel" Bubentsov go free.

Merzlyaev is ready to take any action to save his plan and his reputation, to create any abomination, but is unable to defeat love and generosity of honest people...

Cast
 Stanislav Sadalskiy as  cornet Alexei V. Pletnev 
 Oleg Basilashvili as  count Merzlyaev, privy councilor from St Petersburg
 Yevgeny Leonov as  Athanasios  Bubentsov, provincial actor
 Irina Mazurkievich as Nastya Bubentsova, provincial actress, Bubentsov's daughter
 Valentin Gaft as colonel Ivan  Pokrovsky, the commander of a cavalry regiment
 Georgi Burkov as Artyuhov, Merzlyaev's valet
 Zinovy Gerdt as Lev  Pertsovsky, dealer parrots
 Victor Pavlov as jailer Stepan
 Boryslav Brondukov as 2nd jailer
 Vladimir Nosik as cornet Simpomponchik
 Valery Pogoreltsev as hussar Lytkin
 Nikolai Kochegarov as 2nd Hussar
 Alexey Shmarinov as 3rd Hussar
 Anatoliy Egorov as 4th Hussar
 Natalya Gundareva as Juju, milliner from the Madame Josephine's salon
 Svetlana Nemolyaeva as Zizi, milliner from the Madame Josephine's salon
 Liya Akhedzhakova as Lulu, milliner from the Madame Josephine's salon
 Valentina Talyzina as Anna   Speshneva, provincial actress
 Grigory Shpigel as prompter
 Gotlib Roninson as Mark   Mavzon, provincial actor
 Viktor Filippov as Theodore   Spiridonov, provincial actor
 Alexander Belyavsky as governor
 Zoya Vasilkova as  governor's wife
 Eldar Ryazanov as confectioner
 Andrei Mironov as narrator (voice)

Music
The music for the film was written by the prominent Soviet composer Andrei Petrov, who had frequently worked with Eldar Ryazanov. The songs in the film were based on poems of famous Russian poets from different eras: Denis Davydov, Pyotr Vyazemsky, Mikhail Savoyarov, Marina Tsvetaeva, Mikhail Arkadyevich Svetlov. Later, an album of music based on the film was released, which was recorded with the participation of the USSR State Committee for Cinematography Orchestra (conductor Sergei Skripka) and the State Wind Orchestra of the RSFSR.

Filming scandal
The film proved to be an ordeal for Eldar Ryazanov. The screenplay was written in the summer and autumn of 1978. The State Committee for Cinematography of the USSR did not accept the script, and Eldar Ryazanov brought it to Central Television of the USSR. After a long bureaucratic process the script was adopted into production by Studio Ekran. In autumn 1979 the movie was put into production in the cinematic studio Mosfilm. But soon came the decision that stunned Ryazanov - to shut down the film. In December 1979, Soviet troops entered Afghanistan and the Soviet censors saw the script of the film as a kind of "sedition". Initially, according to the creators, Merzlyaev was a Gendarme officer, but then, at the insistence of the TV authorities, any mention of that Russian "law enforcement agency" should be excluded from the screenplay. Screenplay authors  Ryazanov and Gorin were surprised - "Soviet power" that toppled down "damned tsarism" in 1917,  in 1979 struggled to protect one of the most hideous manifestations of "tsar's power" - "political police" represented in the movie by Gendarmes. Despite all his attempts to change the decision of TV authorities, Ryazanov could not do anything.

Then Ryazanov and Gorin made a decision to rewrite the script. The general meaning of the film was immediately distorted, the story developed numerous inconsistencies and logical absurdities. Merzlyaev became an indistinct official with special assignments. To emphasize his involvement in the secret services, he was awarded the rank of Actual Privy Councilor. Such rank, equal to that of the general, in the Russian Empire, could be held only by high-ranking officials of the ministerial level. It looked unlikely that an official of such rank would personally come to a provincial town and get engaged in petty intrigues.

Total control and censorship continued in the course of the filming. In his autobiography Ryazanov tells of flagrant cases of such intervention. For example, in one of the humorous episodes, actor Bubentsov (played by Yevgeny Leonov) was supposed to quote the famous poem by Lermontov: "Farewell, unwashed Russia!". TV bosses noticed the lines: "... And you, blue uniforms, and you, people faithful to them" and considered them as "seditious" hints at the Gendarmes. They ordered a replacement for the poem. Enraged Ryazanov, in vain, shouted in the face of the censors, that this Lermontov's poem is not an illegal literature and is learned by heart in every Soviet school. In the final version the actor Bubentsov quoted Pushkin's poem: "I sit behind bars in a damp prison ..."

Ryazanov, wrote in his book:
Working over the film "Say a Word for the Poor Hussar" was not only a test for professionalism, it was a test for integrity, honesty and generosity. The content of the movie corresponded to our lives, to our work. The provocations, intrigues, infamies, that were described in our scenario, we had tested on ourselves while shooting the movie. Every scene that was planned to be shot tomorrow, as a rule, was remodel, refined, and appended the day before, which also increased the chaos and confusion on the film set. Perhaps "Say a Word for the Poor Hussar"  was my most difficult work. Blows rained down on from all sides, from within and without.

References

External links

1981 films
1981 comedy films
Soviet black-and-white films
Mosfilm films
1980s Russian-language films
Films directed by Eldar Ryazanov
Films scored by Andrey Petrov
Soviet comedy films
Russian comedy films
Russian black-and-white films